Professor Digital/Cidade Industrial is an extended play by Brazilian new wave band Agentss. It was released through WEA in 1983, and was their second and last release before their break-up in the same year.

The EP is notable for being one of the first records in Brazil to have a computer-generated cover art; it was provided by an old VAX-11/780 minicomputer.

Track listing

Personnel
 Kodiak Bachine – vocals, keyboards
 Miguel Barella – guitar
 Eduardo Amarante – guitar
 Thomas Susemihl – bass
 Elias Glik – drums
 Pena Schmidt – production
 Ivo Barreto – sound engineering

References

1983 EPs
Agentss albums